The Athens Olympic Velodrome is a velodrome stadium that is located in Marousi, Athens, Greece, at the Athens Olympic Sports Complex. The stadium, which seats 5,250 - though only 3,300 seats were made publicly available for the 2004 Summer Olympic Games - has distinctive twin roofs, covering the stands on each side.

History
The Olympic Velodrome was originally built in 1991 as an outdoor venue, for the Mediterranean Games. It was extensively refurbished in order to host the track cycling events at the 2004 Athens Summer Olympics. It was redesigned for the 2004 Olympics by Spanish architect Santiago Calatrava who added a roof. Reconstruction of the stadium was completed on May 30, 2004, and it was officially re-opened on July 30, 2004.

References
2004 Summer Olympics official report. Volume 2. p. 303.
OAKA.com profile.

External links
 information at FixedGearFever.com

Sports venues completed in 1991
Venues of the 2004 Summer Olympics
Velodrome
Velodromes in Greece
Cycle racing in Greece
Olympic cycling venues
1991 establishments in Greece